Articles (arranged alphabetically) related to Saudi Arabia include:



0-9 
 1969 Saudi Arabian coup d'état plot
 1979 Grand Mosque seizure
 2011–2012 Saudi Arabian protests
 2016 Saudi Arabia bombings
 2016 Saudi Arabia mass execution
 2017 Saudi Arabian purge
 2017–19 Qatar diplomatic crisis
 2018 Riyadh missile strike
 2018 Saudi Vision 2030 
 2020 G20 Riyadh summit

A 
 Abortion in Saudi Arabia
 Abraj Al Bait
 Abu Hadriyah Highway
 Agriculture in Saudi Arabia
 Ahmadiyya in Saudi Arabia
 Al-Ahsa Governorate
 Al-Ahsa International Airport
 Al-Ahsa Oasis
 Al-Awamiyah
 Al Basar International Foundation
 Al Faisaliyah Center
 Al Hamra (Riyadh)
 Al Majdoul Tower
 Al Oud cemetery
 Al-Qassim Region
 Al Rajhi Tower
 Al Riyadh
 Alleged Saudi role in September 11 attacks
 Allegiance Council
 Americans living in Saudi Arabia
 Ancient towns in Saudi Arabia
 Antisemitism in Saudi Arabia
 Arab Open University
 Armed Forces of Saudi Arabia
 Australians in Saudi Arabia

B 
 Bahrain–Saudi Arabia relations
 Basic Law of Saudi Arabia
 Batha (Riyadh)
 Battle of Mecca (1924)
 Battle of Riyadh (1902)
 Blasphemy law in Saudi Arabia
 British International School, Riyadh
 Buddhism in Saudi Arabia
 Burj Al Anoud
 Burj Rafal

C 
 Capital Market Authority Headquarters
 Catholic Church in Saudi Arabia
 Cannabis in Saudi Arabia
 Capital Markets Authority of Saudi Arabia
 Capital punishment in Saudi Arabia
 Catholic Church in Saudi Arabia
 Censorship in Saudi Arabia
 Christianity in Saudi Arabia
 Cinema of Saudi Arabia
 Citizen’s Account Program (Saudi Arabia)
 Climate of Saudi Arabia
 Committee for the Promotion of Virtue and the Prevention of Vice
 Communications and Information Technology Commission (Saudi Arabia)
 Communications in Saudi Arabia
 Consultative Assembly of Saudi Arabia
 Contract Law of Saudi Arabia
 Copyright law of Saudi Arabia
 Council of Ministers of Saudi Arabia
 Council of Senior Scholars (Saudi Arabia)
 Cricket in Saudi Arabia
 Crime in Saudi Arabia
 Crown Prince of Saudi Arabia
 Culture of Saudi Arabia
 Custodian of the Two Holy Mosques

D 
 Dammam
 Deera Square
 Demographics of Saudi Arabia
 Descendants of Ibn Saud
 Destination (magazine)
 Destruction of early Islamic heritage sites in Saudi Arabia
 Dhahran
 Dhahran Airfield
 Dhahran International Airport
 Diriyah
 Disability in Saudi Arabia
 Domestic violence in Saudi Arabia

E 
 E-Government in Saudi Arabia
 Eastern Orthodoxy in Saudi Arabia
 Eastern Province, Saudi Arabia
 Economy of Saudi Arabia
 Education in Saudi Arabia
 Educational technology in Saudi Arabia
 Elections in Saudi Arabia
 Embassy of Saudi Arabia in France
 Embassy of Saudi Arabia in Moscow
 Embassy of Saudi Arabia, London
 Emblem of Saudi Arabia
 Energy in Saudi Arabia
 Entrepreneurship Policies in Saudi Arabia
 Environment of Saudi Arabia

F 
 Flag of Saudi Arabia
 Football in Saudi Arabia
 Foreign relations of Saudi Arabia
 Foreign workers in Saudi Arabia
 France–Saudi Arabia relations
 Free Princes Movement
 Freedom of religion in Saudi Arabia
 Future Investment Initiative

G 
 GCC Standardization Organization
 General Authority for Entertainment (Saudi Arabia)
 General Intelligence Presidency
 Geography of Saudi Arabia
 Geology of Saudi Arabia
 Girl Guides of Saudi Arabia
 Grand Mufti of Saudi Arabia
 Great Mosque of Mecca
 Greece–Saudi Arabia relations
 Gulf Cooperation Council
 Gulf Road (Saudi Arabia)

H 
 Ha'il 
 Health care in Saudi Arabia
 Health in Saudi Arabia
 Highway 40 (Saudi Arabia)
 Highway 65 (Saudi Arabia)
 Highway 613 (Saudi Arabia)
 History of King Saud University
 History of Saudi Arabia
 History of the oil industry in Saudi Arabia
 Hofuf
 House of Saud
 Human resources in Saudi Arabia
 Human rights in Saudi Arabia
 Human trafficking in Saudi Arabia

I 
 Illegal immigration to Saudi Arabia
 Imam Turki bin Abdullah Mosque
 International rankings of Saudi Arabia
 Irqah
 Irreligion in Saudi Arabia
 Irrigation in Saudi Arabia
 Islam in Saudi Arabia
 Islamic banking in Saudi Arabia

J 
 Japan–Saudi Arabia relations
 Jeddah
 Jeddah Regional Museum of Archaeology and Ethnography
 Joint Chiefs of Staff (Saudi Arabia)
 Joraf
 Jubail
 Judiciary of Saudi Arabia

K 
 Khalid of Saudi Arabia
 Khobar
 King Abdul Aziz Historical Centre
 King Abdulaziz City for Science and Technology
 King Abdulaziz Medical City
 King Abdullah City for Atomic and Renewable Energy
 King Abdullah Financial District
 King Fahd Causeway
 King Fahd International Airport
 King Fahd International Stadium
 King Fahd National Library
 King Khalid International Airport
 King Saud Medical Complex
 King Saud University
 King Saud University Stadium
 Kingdom Centre
 Kingdom Holding Company
 Kingdom of Hejaz and Nejd
 Kings of Saudi Arabia
 Kuwait Liberation Medal (Saudi Arabia)
 Kuwait–Saudi Arabia relations

L 
 Legal system of Saudi Arabia
 List of cities in Saudi Arabia
 List of diplomatic missions in Saudi Arabia
 List of governorates of Saudi Arabia
 List of lighthouses in Saudi Arabia
 List of museums in Saudi Arabia
 List of rulers of Saudi Arabia
 List of Saudis by net worth
 List of sports venues in Saudi Arabia
 List of tallest buildings in Saudi Arabia
 List of things named after Saudi kings
 List of wars involving Saudi Arabia
 List of years in Saudi Arabia

M 
 Mada'in Saleh
 Makkah Region
 Masmak fort
 Mecca
 Media of Saudi Arabia
 Medina
 Military Industries Corporation (Saudi Arabia)
 Military of Saudi Arabia
 Minister of Defense (Saudi Arabia)
 Ministry of Education (Saudi Arabia)
 Ministry of Energy, Industry and Mineral Resources
 Ministry of Finance (Saudi Arabia)
 Ministry of Foreign Affairs (Saudi Arabia)
 Ministry of Hajj and Umrah
 Ministry of Health (Saudi Arabia)
 Ministry of Interior (Saudi Arabia)
 Ministry of Justice (Saudi Arabia)
 Ministry of Media (Saudi Arabia)
 Murabba Palace
 Music of Saudi Arabia

N 
 Najd
 Nakheel Tower, Riyadh
 National Anthem of Saudi Arabia
 National Cybersecurity Authority (Saudi Arabia)
 National Museum of Saudi Arabia
 National Security Council (Saudi Arabia)
 National Transformation Program 2020 (Saudi Arabia)
 Nature Arabic Edition
 New Middle East International School, Riyadh
 Nuclear energy in Saudi Arabia
 Nuclear program of Saudi Arabia

O 
 Obesity in Saudi Arabia
 Oil reserves in Saudi Arabia
 Olaya (Riyadh)
 Olaya Towers
 OPEC

P 
 Political prisoners in Saudi Arabia
 Politics of Saudi Arabia
 Polygamy in Saudi Arabia
 Presidency of State Security
 Prime Minister of Saudi Arabia
 Prince Sultan University
 Prince Sultan Advanced Technology Research Institute
 Princes' School
 Protestantism in Saudi Arabia
 Public holidays in Saudi Arabia
 Public Investment Fund of Saudi Arabia

Q 
 Qatar–Saudi Arabia relations
 Qatif
 Quds Street
 Qurayyat, Saudi Arabia

R 
 Racism in Saudi Arabia
 Rape in Saudi Arabia
 Red Sand (Riyadh)
 Regions of Saudi Arabia
 Religion in Saudi Arabia
 Renewable energy in Saudi Arabia
 Response of Saudi Arabia to ISIL
 Rimah Governorate
 Riyadh the capital
 Riyadh Air Base
 Riyadh College of Dentistry and Pharmacy
 Riyadh College of Technology
 Riyadh compound bombings
 Riyadh Dry Port
 Riyadh Japanese School
 Riyadh Metro
 Riyadh Military Hospital
 Riyadh railway station
 Riyadh Region
 Riyadh Street Circuit
 Riyadh Techno Valley
 Riyadh TV Tower
 Road signs in Saudi Arabia
 Rock Art in the Ha'il Region
 Royal Saudi Air Defense
 Royal Saudi Air Force
 Royal Saudi Air Force Museum
 Royal Saudi Navy
 Royal Saudi Strategic Missile Force

S 
 Saudi Public Transport Company (SAPTCO)

 Sahara Mall (Riyadh)
 SAR Riyadh–Qurayyat line
 Saud of Saudi Arabia
 Saudi Arabia
 Saudi Arabia and weapons of mass destruction
 Saudi Arabia at the 2012 Summer Olympics
 Saudi Arabia at the Olympics
 Saudi Arabia-Austria relations
 Saudi Arabia national football team
 Saudi Arabia Standard Time
 Saudi Arabia–United Arab Emirates border dispute
 Saudi Arabian army
 Saudi Arabian art
 Saudi Arabian Border Guards
 Saudi Arabian Boy Scouts Association
 Saudi Arabian Football Federation
 Saudi Arabian General Investment Authority
 Saudi Arabian identity card
 Saudi Arabian-led intervention in Yemen
 Saudi Arabian involvement in the Syrian Civil War
 Saudi Arabian military ranks
 Saudi Arabian National Guard
 Saudi Arabian nationality law
 Saudi Arabian Olympic Committee
 Saudi Arabian passport
 Saudi Arabian textbook controversy
 Saudi Aramco
 Saudi Broadcasting Authority
 Saudi Commission for Tourism and National Heritage
 Saudi–Egypt Causeway
 Saudi Emergency Force
 Saudi Environmental Society
 Saudi foreign assistance
 Saudi Geological Survey
 Saudi International (golf)
 Saudi-led intervention in Bahrain
 Saudi list of most-wanted suspected terrorists
 Saudi National Day
 Saudi Post
 Saudi Press Agency
 Saudi Red Crescent Authority
 Saudi riyal
 Saudi Royal Guard Regiment
 Saudi Sign Language
 Saudi–Yemeni border conflict (2015–present)
 Saudization
 Scouting and Guiding in Saudi Arabia
 Shia Islam in Saudi Arabia
 Siemens Saudi Arabia
 Sky Prime Aviation
 Smoking in Saudi Arabia
 Specialized Criminal Court
 Sport in Saudi Arabia
 Subdivisions of Saudi Arabia
 Succession to the Saudi Arabian throne
 Supreme Judicial Council of Saudi Arabia
 Syrians in Saudi Arabia

T 
 Tadawul
 Tahlia Street
 Tarout
 Telephone numbers in Saudi Arabia
 Television in Saudi Arabia
 Terrorism in Saudi Arabia
 Theatre in Saudi Arabia
 Tiger Squad
 Timeline of Riyadh
 Tiran Island
 Tourism in Saudi Arabia
 Transport in Saudi Arabia
 Turks in Saudi Arabia
 Tuwaa
 Tuwaiq Palace

U 
 Uhod Road
 Umm Al-Hamam
 Unification of Saudi Arabia
 United Arab Emirates
 United States withdrawal from Saudi Arabia

V 
 Vehicle registration plates of Saudi Arabia
 Villas in the Sky
 Virgin Mobile Saudi Arabia
 Visa policy of Saudi Arabia
 Visa requirements for Saudi citizens

W 
 Wabar craters
 Wahhabism
 Water supply and sanitation in Saudi Arabia
 Wildlife of Saudi Arabia
 Women's rights in Saudi Arabia
 Women to drive movement

X 
 Xenophobia and racism in the Middle East

Y 
 Youth in Saudi Arabia

Z

References

See also

Lists of country-related topics - similar lists for other countries

 
Saudi Arabia